RTÉ Sport is a department of Irish public broadcaster RTÉ. The department provides sporting coverage through a number of platforms including RTÉ Radio, RTÉ Television, RTÉ.ie, RTÉ Player Sport and RTÉ Mobile. RTÉ holds the television and radio broadcasting rights in the Republic of Ireland to several sports, broadcasting the sport live or alongside flagship analysis programmes such as The Sunday Game, Thank GAA It's Friday, Soccer Republic and RTÉ Racing on RTÉ Television, and Game On, Saturday Sport, and Sunday Sport on RTÉ Radio.

Traditionally RTÉ Sport faced competition from British-based broadcasters such as the BBC and ITV which have always been present in Ireland; however, these broadcasters were primarily concerned with the British public and market. Domestically, RTÉ had no competition until the late 1990s due to lack of competition in the Irish market. In latter years however a growth of variety in the Irish market opened competition between other broadcasters most notably with TG4 and Setanta Sports but also TV3. RTÉ Sport is also in competition with other European broadcasters such as Eurosport, ESPN, Sky Sports, BBC Sport and ITV Sport. Despite competition in sporting events such as the FIFA World Cup final which is also available on the BBC and ITV, RTÉ Sport remains Ireland's premier and most popular sports broadcaster.

Television broadcasts
On television RTÉ Two is the home of live sporting action, broadcasting the majority of RTÉ's sports content. Sport may also be broadcast on RTÉ One, but this is mainly due to scheduling issues.

Football

RTÉ Sport currently holds the rights to a large portfolio of football tournaments including:
 FIFA World Cup finals
 Republic of Ireland qualification matches for both World Cup finals and Euro finals
 UEFA Champions League (women's (final only, from 2019 to 2020) and men's)
 FIFA Club World Cup
 FAI League of Ireland
 FAI Cup
 FAI Women's Cup Final
 UEFA Super Cup

The Republic of Ireland matches were shown live on the channel for Euro 2004, the 2006 World Cup and Euro 2008, for all of which, they failed to qualify. Sky Sports got exclusive rights to Irish matches in the early 2000s and there were fears that National team matches couldn't be seen by fans so the government stepped in and now all Irish home and away qualifying matches have to be shown on Irish free to air TV, meaning either RTÉ, TV3 or TG4, and have remained on RTÉ as well as Sky Sports. Irish Home friendlies were exclusive to Sky from 2000 and from 2014 on Premier Sports with highlights broadcast on either RTÉ or TV3.

RTÉ Sport broadcasts association football tournaments. It showed 64 live games during the 2010 World Cup and that was 200 hours of programming.

These were the team of association football pundits that RTÉ Sport announced ahead of the 2010 World Cup. Apart from Ossie Ardiles, Dietmar Hamann and Kevin Kilbane, both made their debuts, and Liam Brady, who left his post assisting Ireland manager Giovanni Trapattoni, the rest were all regulars on RTÉ Sport's association football programming. The 2010 FIFA World Cup was the ninth for both Bill O'Herlihy and George Hamilton.

For the 2014 World Cup, the RTÉ team was announced on 5 May 2014. The coverage was presented by 
Bill O'Herlihy, Darragh Maloney and Tony O'Donoghue. The pundits for the tournament were RTÉ regulars John Giles, Liam Brady, Eamon Dunphy, Kenny Cunningham, Richie Sadlier and Ronnie Whelan. Guest pundits joining the coverage included Didi Hamann, Ossie Ardiles, Neil Lennon and Brad Friedel. Play-by-play came from George Hamilton, John Kenny, Stephen Alkin and Adrian Eames while colour commentators included Ray Houghton, Trevor Steven, Jim Beglin and Brian Kerr.

This was Bill O'Herlihy's final World Cup for RTÉ and his 11th World Cup for the broadcaster. Hamann and Ardiles both worked for RTÉ at the last World Cup in 2010 while Lennon and Friedel both working for the BBC at the World Cup and Jim Beglin rejoined RTÉ after leaving ITV in 2013.

RTÉ provided live coverage of all live games of the UEFA Women's Euro 2022 , the first time a major woman's football tournament was broadcast live in its entirety.

RTÉ cover at least one match per week from the FAI League, these matches are usually hosted by Peter Collins or Tony O'Donohue with guests from Irish football such as Richie Sadlier, Kenny Cunningham, Roddy Collins. Commentary comes from Stephen Alkin, Adrian Eames, John Kenny, Ger Canning or George Hamilton.

The Premiership was RTÉ's flagship Premier League programme until 2008, when Premier Soccer Saturday was launched. The Premiership was shown on Saturday nights at 7.30pm. There were sometimes Premiership Specials which would normally be shown on a Sunday evening at 8.00pm or on a Monday night. These programmes are hosted usually by Darragh Maloney or Peter Collins with analysis mainly by Kenny Cunningham, Johnny Giles, Ronnie Whelan, Richie Sadlier, Liam Brady, Trevor Steven, Graeme Souness or Matt Holland. Premier Soccer Saturday was dropped from RTÉ's schedules from the 2013/14 season.

Presenters (usually one per game):
Darragh Maloney, Peter Collins, Joanne Cantwell

Panels (usually two, three, or four per game): Liam Brady, Ronnie Whelan, Richie Sadlier, Denis Irwin, Ossie Ardiles, Dietmar Hamann, Kevin Kilbane, Brad Friedel, Paul Clement, Neil Lennon, Michael O'Neill

Commentators (usually two per game):
George Hamilton, Ray Houghton, Gabriel Egan, Trevor Steven, Stephen Alkin, Damien Richardson, Adrian Eames, Matt Holland, Brian Kerr, Darragh Maloney

Former RTÉ Sport personnel:
Bill O'Herlihy, Con Murphy, Jimmy Magee, Graeme Souness, John Giles, Eamon Dunphy,

The RTÉ Sport football division has achieved cult status due to its unintentional humour. The former main team of Bill O'Herlihy, Johnny Giles, Eamon Dunphy and Liam Brady was usually used for Irish matches and Champions League matches, with a usual big build up and long analysis afterwards which gain huge ratings.

Gaelic games
In 1926, RTÉ broadcast the first field game in Europe. The GAA match was live on the radio, 2RN, RTÉ's predecessor. RTÉ Sport is probably the second most significant of the categories since often hundreds of thousands would watch The Sunday Game, with probably more than a million watching on the day of the All-Ireland Final.

RTÉ GAA coverage is the cornerstone of their sports coverage. RTÉ previously held the exclusive rights for television and radio in the Republic for the entirety of the Championship compromising of interprovincial games, All Ireland Qualifying games and the All Ireland Championship series. The games were also available in Northern Ireland who although able to see Ulster games on BBC Northern Ireland, did not receive the breadth of coverage as available on RTÉ. In 2008, however, TV3 won the rights to show 10 Championship games marking an end to RTÉ's exclusivity. RTÉ though remain the sole broadcaster on radio and retained the All Ireland series exclusively with 40 championship games available on television. Games are also available online at RTÉ.i.e. RTÉ also show highlights of club and National League games on their Sunday Sport banner through the winter and spring.  In 2011 under a new deal BBC NI show all Ulster Championship matches mostly Live and some deferred shown in full, as well as live coverage of the All Ireland Championship if an Ulster team is playing.  Under the 2011 deal TV3 showed 11 matches including both All Ireland minor finals with coverage on TV3 in English and sister channel 3e in Irish.  In 2014 a new deal was announced with TV3 losing their coverage to Sky Sports, RTÉ keep their share of the matches but Sky have 14 exclusive matches and other matches such as the All Ireland Semi Finals and Finals which are shared between RTÉ and Sky. Under this deal BBC NI also get to show matches as long as RTÉ also cover them.

The All-Ireland Football Final traditionally attracts high ratings with it too attracting high ratings in previous years.

Coverage

RTÉ's championship games are broadcast through their The Sunday Game banner; for more information on their coverage see there.

Among other sports, RTÉ broadcasts the following on television (usually on RTÉ Two):

 The Sunday Game – coverage of All-Ireland Senior Football Championship and All-Ireland Senior Hurling Championship games (May – September)
 League of Ireland Live – coverage of League of Ireland matches
 Against the Head – review and discussion of rugby union games
 RTÉ Racing – coverage of major Irish racing festivals
 Pro Box Live – coverage of professional boxing cards
 Soccer Republic - highlights of League of Ireland on Monday nights

Sports news bulletins are broadcast hourly on RTÉ 2fm under the title RTÉ Sport on 2fm.

Rugby union
RTÉ's coverage of rugby remains popular, underlined by the fact that Ireland's Grand Slam decider versus Wales was the overall top rated programme of 2009 with a 68% share of the total audience watching television with 866,000 viewers. The game was also shown on the widely available BBC One, but still ranks above other programmes exclusive to RTÉ.

In 2010 RTÉ bought the rights for Celtic League rugby with TG4, BBC Northern Ireland and BBC Alba. In 2014 Sky Sports signed a non-exclusive deal to cover the Pro 12, under the new contract TG4 continue to show the tournament free to air for Ireland, BBC Wales and S4C continue to cover the tournament in Wales, BBC Scotland return to cover the tournament alongside BBC Alba and BBC Northern Ireland cover all Ulster Matches not being Broadcast by Sky.  Under this new deal RTÉ dropped the Pro12 Rugby but continue to show every game in the 6 Nations and all Ireland Autumn Internationals.

RTÉ showed the Heineken Cup for many years and after the coverage was snapped up by Sky Sports in 2004, RTÉ still showed Live coverage until 2007 and then highlights afterwards but in 2011 TG4 took their highlights coverage of the Heineken Cup, Amlin Cup to add to their Pro 12 coverage and Rugby World Cup highlights.  As of 2014 RTÉ is the Home of International Rugby holding rights to the 6 Nations and Autumn Internationals signing a deal with Sky Sports to cover Ireland Autumn Internationals. 

The Rugby World Cup returned to RTÉ in 2011 after an 8-year gap as the 2007 tournament was on TV3 Ireland.  Their coverage was the same as TV3 in the sense they had only 13 live matches with every Irish match Live and every match from the quarter-final onwards with Setanta holding every Live match and TG4 had lucrative daytime deferred rights meaning they can show a full re run of a match in the afternoon.  RTÉ also broadcast highlights in primetime between 7pm and 10pm on RTÉ Two. Their Live coverage was presented by Tom McGurk with analysis by Conor O'Shea, Brent Pope and George Hook.  Highlights were presented by Daire O'Brien who hosts their Pro 12 coverage with analysis from Victor Costello, Shane Horgan, Frankie Shehan, Leinster coach Joe Schmidt and new signing from ESPN, Ben Kay who won the World Cup in 2003 with England.  RTÉ Commentary team consists of Hugh Cahill, Ryle Nugent, Donal Lenihan, Tony Ward, Ralph Keyes and Kurt McQuilkin.  George Hamilton was supposed to be part of commentary but he had a heart attack so Darragh Maloney is instead commentating.  Any highlights that did not have an RTÉ voiceover instead featured the World Feed, one example was in the highlights show with an England match using Sky Sports Commentators who worked for ITV in 2007, Miles Harrison and Stuart Barnes.  RTÉ lost the rights to TV3 for the 2015 Rugby World Cup in England.

After they lost the rights to coverage of the Six Nations to TV3, RTE showed live Women's and U20's matches in 2018. Coverage was usually presented by Daire O'Brien, with analysis by the likes of Bernard Jackman and James Downey, with commentary from the normal team of Hugh Cahill, Donal Lenihan and more.

Golf
RTÉ holds exclusive Irish rights to live coverage of the only professional golf tournament to take place in Ireland, The Irish Open, covering every day's play Live. In 2011 they had play everyday on RTÉ One and Highlights on RTÉ Two late at night.  Sky Sports also show all four days of the Irish Open live. RTÉ Radio also cover Saturday and Sunday's action live on Saturday and Sunday Sport.

Other sports
RTÉ also screen a lot of horse racing, including the Galway Races and Punchestown they have their own coverage for Irish Racing with Treacy Piggott but they take Channel 4 coverage when covering the Grand National, The Derby and the Cheltenham Festival. Sport is shown on RTÉ News.

A programme for the Beijing Olympics was shown on RTÉ Two before the games, called Ireland's Olympians. RTÉ broadcast most of Ireland's candidates for the gold medal during the Olympiad, as well as the finals in which no Irish took part.

From the 1970s through to 1997, RTÉ's flagship television sports programme was Sports Stadium, which provided live football and racing coverage on Saturday afternoons along with coverage of other sports and classified football results, in a similar manner to the BBC's Grandstand or ITV's World of Sport. The programme was badly hit by the loss of live rights to Saturday afternoon Football League Division One matches after the beginning of the Premier League in 1992, and ended as part of RTÉ's revamp of Network 2 into N2 in 1997, being replaced for one year by Saturday Sports Live (which only concentrated on one single football or rugby game. Since 1998 RTÉ has not covered live sports on Saturday on a weekly basis on television, although major events such as the Six Nations Championship are still shown live.

For many years, RTÉ was the official broadcaster in Ireland of Formula One with its coverage presented by Peter Collins.

Radio Sport 
RTÉ's regular radio sports programming (usually on RTÉ Radio 1) comprises:
 Saturday Sport – coverage of Premier League and other Saturday sports
 Sunday Sport – coverage of GAA and other Sunday sports

Sports news bulletins are broadcast hourly on RTÉ 2fm under the title RTÉ Sport on 2fm. RTÉ Sport also broadcasts an hour long sports programme Game On from 7pm Monday – Friday on 2fm.

Controversies
When the 2012 RTÉ Sports Person of the Year award was being given to boxer Katie Taylor viewers were instead shown an advertisement for the cosmetics and beauty company L'Oréal, causing uproar. Group head of sport Ryle Nugent commented: "RTÉ sports awards offers sincere apologies for the technical issue at the end of tonight's programme. We're investigating how it happened."

References

External links
 Official website
 Radio
 Television
 RTÉ Sport: In Pictures – photography archive
 RTÉ Sport: "Great Sporting Quotes"

 
Sports divisions of TV channels